Thomas Kirkham (died 1480) was a pre-Reformation cleric who served as the Bishop of Sodor and Man in the second half of the 15th century.

A Cistercian monk, he became the Abbot of Vale Royal in Cheshire around 1438 or 1439. He was also appointed bishop of the Diocese of Sodor and Man by Pope Callixtus III on 21 June 1458. Twenty years later, he appears to have resigned the see, since his successor Richard Oldham was appointed bishop in 1478.

He died in 1480 and was buried at Vale Royal Abbey.

References 

 
 
 
 
 

1480 deaths
15th-century English Roman Catholic bishops
Bishops of Sodor and Man
English Cistercians
English abbots
Year of birth unknown